The 2015 World Figure Skating Championships was an international figure skating competition in the 2014–15 season. Figure skaters competed for the title of World champion in men's singles, ladies' singles, pairs, and ice dancing.

In June 2012, it was announced that Shanghai, China would host the 2015 Worlds. All events were held at the Shanghai Oriental Sports Center.

Qualification
Skaters are eligible for the event if they are representing an ISU member nations and have reached the age of 15 before 1 July 2014 in their place of birth. National associations select their entries according to their own criteria but the ISU mandates that their selections achieve a minimum technical elements score (TES) at an international event prior to the World Championships.

Minimum TES

Number of entries per discipline
Based on the results of the 2014 World Championships, each ISU member nation can field one to three entries per discipline.

Entries
Member nations began announcing their selections in January 2015.

 Anna Ovcharova declined Switzerland's nomination after a poor performance at the 2015 Hellmut Seibt Memorial and was replaced by Eveline Brunner.
 On March 19, 2015 Penny Coomes / Nicholas Buckland withdrew due to Coomes having an illness. They were not replaced.

Results

Men

The Men's short program was held on March 27. The free skate was held on March 28.

Ladies
The Ladies short program was held on March 26. The free skate was held on March 28, 2015.

Pairs
The pairs short program was held on March 25. The free skate was held on March 26.

Ice dancing
The short dance was held on March 25. The free dance was held on March 27, 2015.

Medals summary

Medalists
Medals for overall placement:

Small medals for placement in the short segment:

Small medals for placement in the free segment:

By country
Table of medals for overall placement:

Table of small medals for placement in the short segment:

Table of small medals for placement in the free segment:

References

External links
 2015 ISU World Figure Skating Championships International Skating Union

World Figure Skating Championships, 2015
World Figure Skating Championships
World Figure Skating Championships
World Figure
World 2015
March 2015 sports events in China
2010s in Shanghai